Maggie McOmie is an American stage and film actress, best known for co-starring with Robert Duvall in George Lucas' 1971 film THX 1138. Though the film received mixed reviews at the time, it has since developed a cult following.

Career
McOmie chose not to pursue a film career following THX 1138, which remains her only major film credit, although she returned to the screen in small roles in the 2006 films Grand Junction and The Boston Strangler.  Throughout the years, she has remained active in small plays and productions, both in Los Angeles and now in her home of Portland, Oregon.  She has an adult daughter and two young grandchildren.

Filmography
THX 1138 (1971) - LUH
Grand Junction (2006) - Carol

References

External links
 

American film actresses
American stage actresses
20th-century American actresses
Living people
1941 births
21st-century American women